The Salzburg Football Association (German:Salzburger Fußballverband; SFV) is the umbrella organization of the football clubs of the Austrian state  Salzburg. The SFV was founded in 1921 and has its headquarters in Salzburg.

The SFV is one of 8 regional organizations of the Austrian Football Association (ÖFB).

In 2015, SFV had 25,000 members from 133 football clubs with 765 teams.

References

External links
 SFV website 

Football in Austria
Sport in Salzburg (state)